Ptocasius is a genus of Asian jumping spiders that was first described by Eugène Louis Simon in 1885.

Species
 it contains fifty-two species, found only in Asia:

Ptocasius badongensis (Song & Chai, 1992) – China
Ptocasius bhutanicus (Żabka, 1981) – Bhutan
Ptocasius bilagunculus (Xie & Peng, 1995) – China
Ptocasius bulbosus (Peng, Tang & Li, 2008) – China
Ptocasius cambridgei (Żabka, 1981) – Bhutan
Ptocasius falcatus (Zhu, J. X. Zhang, Z. S. Zhang & Chen, 2005) – China
Ptocasius fulvonitens Simon, 1902 – Sri Lanka
Ptocasius gogonaicus (Żabka, 1981) – Bhutan
Ptocasius gratiosus Peckham & Peckham, 1907 – Singapore
Ptocasius helvetorum (Żabka, 1981) – Bhutan
Ptocasius hubeiensis (Li, Wang, Irfan & Peng, 2018) – China
Ptocasius hybridus (Żabka, 1981) – Bhutan
Ptocasius incognitus (Żabka, 1981) – Bhutan
Ptocasius intermedius (Żabka, 1981) – Bhutan
Ptocasius kinhi Żabka, 1985 – China, Vietnam
Ptocasius linzhiensis Hu, 2001 – China
Ptocasius linzhiensis (Hu, 2001) – China
Ptocasius lushiensis (Zhang & Zhu, 2007) – China
Ptocasius metzneri Patoleta, Gardzińska & Żabka, 2020 – Thailand
Ptocasius montanus (Żabka, 1981) – China, Bhutan
Ptocasius montiformis Song, 1991 – China
Ptocasius nanyuensis (Xie & Peng, 1995) – China
Ptocasius nepalicus (Żabka, 1980) – Nepal, China
Ptocasius nobilis (Żabka, 1981) – Bhutan
Ptocasius novus (Żabka, 1981) – Bhutan
Ptocasius orientalis (Żabka, 1981) – Bhutan
Ptocasius originalis (Żabka, 1981) – Myanmar
Ptocasius paraweyersi Cao & Li, 2016 – China
Ptocasius pilosus (Żabka, 1981) – Bhutan
Ptocasius plumipalpis (Thorell, 1895) – Myanmar
Ptocasius pseudoflexus (Liu, Yang & Peng, 2016) – China
Ptocasius pulchellus (Li, Wang, Irfan & Peng, 2018) – China
Ptocasius sakaerat Patoleta, Gardzińska & Żabka, 2020 – Thailand
Ptocasius senchalensis (Prószyński, 1992) – India
Ptocasius silvaticus (Żabka, 1981) – Bhutan
Ptocasius simoni (Żabka, 1981) – Bhutan
Ptocasius songi Logunov, 1995 – China
Ptocasius stemmleri (Żabka, 1981) – Bhutan
Ptocasius strandi (Żabka, 1981) – Bhutan
Ptocasius strupifer Simon, 1901 – China, Vietnam
Ptocasius supinus (Żabka, 1981) – Bhutan
Ptocasius tenellus (Żabka, 1981) – Bhutan
Ptocasius tenzingi (Żabka, 1980) – Nepal
Ptocasius thakkholaicus (Żabka, 1980) – Nepal, China
Ptocasius thimphuicus (Żabka, 1981) – Bhutan
Ptocasius urbanii (Żabka, 1981) – Bhutan
Ptocasius variegatus Logunov, 1995 – Kazakhstan
Ptocasius versicolor (Żabka, 1981) – Bhutan
Ptocasius vittatus Song, 1991 – China
Ptocasius wangdicus (Żabka, 1981) – Bhutan
Ptocasius weyersi Simon, 1885 (type) – Vietnam, Indonesia (Sumatra)
Ptocasius wuermli (Żabka, 1981) – Bhutan, China

References

Salticidae genera
Salticidae
Spiders of Asia